Richard Scowcroft (June 26, 1916 – October 8, 2001) was an American writer and teacher of writers long associated with Stanford University, where he co-founded the creative-writing program with, and ultimately succeeded, Wallace Stegner as director. Among the writers taught were Tillie Olsen, Wendell Berry, Robert Stone, Larry McMurtry, Karen Rosenbaum, Ed McClanahan, Ken Kesey, Scott Turow and Chuck Kinder. Scowcroft's work frequently featured themes based in his Mormon upbringing.

Novels
Children of the Covenant (1945)
First Family (1950)
A View of the Bay (1955)
Wherever She Goes (1966)
The Ordeal of Dudley Dean (1969)
Back to Fire Mountain (1973)

References

Sources
Memorial Resolution: Richard P. Scowcroft
Scowcroft, former Creative Writing director, dies at 85 by John Sanford
Richard Scowcroft, 85; Novelist Headed Writing Program at Stanford by Myrna Oliver

External links
Richard Scowcroft Papers

1916 births
American Latter Day Saint writers
20th-century American novelists
Novelists from Utah
Writers from California
Stanford University faculty
American male novelists
2001 deaths
Writers from the San Francisco Bay Area
20th-century American male writers
Latter Day Saints from California
20th-century American non-fiction writers
American male non-fiction writers